Gyroporus phaeocyanescens is a species of bolete fungus in the family Gyroporaceae. It was described as new to science in 1983 from collections made in Belize.

See also
List of North American boletes

References

External links

Boletales
Fungi described in 1983
Fungi of Central America